The Lys (Walser German: Liisu or Lyesu) is a small  river (classified as a torrente).

Geography 
It flows from the Lys Glacier on the south side of the Monte Rosa massif, at the foot of Vincent Pyramid, elevation , and runs through the Gressoney Valley, flanked by a road, through the following municipalities:
Gressoney-La-Trinité
Gressoney-Saint-Jean
Gaby
Issime
Fontainemore
Lillianes
Perloz

It converges with the Dora Baltea (fr. Doire baltée) as a right tributary at Pont-Saint-Martin.

Its left-side tributaries are Avant-Cir, Glassit, Loo, Mos, Niel, Pacoulla, and Tourrison. From the right it receives: Rû de Nantay, Stolen and Valbona.

Gallery 

Rivers of Aosta Valley
Rivers of Italy
Rivers of the Alps